The 1976 Currie Cup was the 38th edition of the Currie Cup, the premier annual domestic rugby union competition in South Africa.

Fixtures and Results

Final

See also

 Currie Cup

References

1976
1976 in South African rugby union
1976 rugby union tournaments for clubs